This national electoral calendar for 2012 lists the national/federal elections held in 2012 in all sovereign states and their dependent territories. By-elections are excluded, though national referendums are included.

January
3–4 January: Egypt, People's Assembly (3rd phase 1st round)
10–11 January: Egypt, People's Assembly (3rd phase 2nd round)
13 January: Kiribati, President
14 January: Taiwan, President and Parliament
15 January: Kazakhstan, Assembly
22 January: 
Croatia, EU Referendum
Finland, President (1st round)
29–30 January: Egypt, Consultative Council (1st phase 1st round)

February
2 February: Kuwait, Parliament (election nullified)
5 February: Finland, President (2nd round)
5–6 February: Egypt, Consultative Council (1st phase 2nd round)
12 February: Turkmenistan, President
14–15 February: Egypt, Consultative Council (2nd phase 1st round)
18 February: Latvia, Constitutional Referendum
19–21 February: Sahrawi Arab Democratic Republic, Parliament
21 February: Yemen, President
21–22 February: Egypt, Consultative Council (2nd phase 2nd round)
26 February: 
Senegal, President (1st round)
Syria, Constitutional Referendum

March
2 March: Iran, Parliament (1st round)
4 March: Russia, President
7 March: Belize, House of Representatives
10 March: 
Abkhazia, Parliament (1st round)
Slovakia, Parliament
11 March: 
El Salvador, Parliament
Switzerland, Referendums
17 March: East Timor, President (1st round)
18 March: 
Guinea-Bissau, President (1st round) (election nullified)
Saint Barthélemy, Legislature
Saint Martin, Legislature
Saint Pierre and Miquelon, Legislature
24 March: Abkhazia, Parliament (2nd round)
25 March: 
Senegal, President (2nd round)
Slovenia, Referendum
South Ossetia, President (1st round)
Wallis and Futuna, Legislature
29 March: The Gambia, Parliament

April
8 April: South Ossetia, President (2nd round)
11 April: South Korea, Parliament
16 April: East Timor, President (2nd round)
18 April: Guernsey, Legislature
22 April: France, President (1st round)

May
3 May: Faroe Islands, Referendum
4 May: Iran, Parliament (2nd round)
6 May: 
Armenia, Parliament
France, President (2nd round)
Greece, Parliament
Serbia, President (1st round) and Parliament
7 May: 
Bahamas, House of Assembly
Syria, Parliament
10 May: Algeria, National Assembly
20 May: 
Dominican Republic, President
Serbia, President (2nd round)
23–24 May: Egypt, President (1st round)
26 May: Lesotho, National Assembly
31 May: Ireland, Constitutional Referendum

June
10 June: France, Parliament (1st round)
16–17 June: Egypt, President (2nd round)
17 June: 
France, Parliament (2nd round)
Greece, Parliament
Switzerland, Referendums
23 June – 13 July: Papua New Guinea, Parliament
28 June: Mongolia, Parliament
30 June: Iceland, President

July
1 July: 
Liechtenstein, Constitutional Referendum
Mexico, President, Chamber of Deputies and Senate
Senegal, Parliament
7 July: 
East Timor, Parliament
Libya, General National Congress
15 July: Republic of the Congo, National Assembly (1st round)
18 July: Cayman Islands, Referendum
19 July: Nagorno-Karabakh, President
29 July: 
Republic of the Congo, National Assembly (2nd round)
Romania, Impeachment Referendum

August
19 August: Puerto Rico, Constitutional Referendum
31 August: Angola, Parliament

September
9 September: Hong Kong, Legislature
12 September: Netherlands, House of Representatives
23 September: 
Belarus, House of Representatives
Pitcairn Islands, Referendum
Switzerland, Referendums

October
1 October: Georgia, Parliament
7 October: Venezuela, President
12–13 October: Czech Republic, Senate (1st round)
14 October: 
Lithuania, Parliament (1st round) and Referendum
Montenegro, Parliament
19 October: Curaçao, Legislature
19–20 October: Czech Republic, Senate (2nd round)
20 October: Iceland, Constitutional Referendum
28 October: 
Lithuania, Parliament (2nd round)
Ukraine, Parliament
30 October: Vanuatu, Parliament

November
6 November: 
Palau, President and House of Delegates and Senate
United States, President, House of Representatives and Senate
American Samoa, Governor (1st round), House of Representatives and Constitutional Referendum
Guam, Auditor, Consolidated Commission on Utilities, Education Board, Legislature, Superior Court retention elections and Referendum
Northern Mariana Islands, House of Representatives, Senate, Supreme Court retention elections and Constitutional Referendum
Puerto Rico, Governor, House of Representatives, Senate and Referendum
U.S. Virgin Islands, Board of Education, Board of Elections, Legislature and Referendum
9 November: Turks and Caicos Islands, Legislature
10 November: Ireland, Constitutional Referendum
11 November: 
San Marino, Parliament
Slovenia, President (1st round)
17 November: Sierra Leone, President and Parliament
20 November: American Samoa, Governor (2nd round)
25 November: Switzerland, Referendum

December
1 December: Kuwait, Parliament
2 December: 
Burkina Faso, Parliament
Slovenia, President (2nd round)
7–8 December: Ghana, President and Parliament
9 December: Romania, Chamber of Deputies and Senate
15 December: Egypt, Constitutional Referendum (1st phase)
16 December: Japan, House of Representatives and 
17 December: Bermuda, House of Assembly
19 December: South Korea, President
22 December: Egypt, Constitutional Referendum (2nd phase)

Indirect elections
The following indirect elections of heads of state and the upper houses of bicameral legislatures took place through votes in elected lower houses, unicameral legislatures, or electoral colleges: 
3 January: Marshall Islands, President
11 January and 16 March: Moldova, President
19 January, 30 March and 25 June: India, Council of States
29 January: Cambodia, Senate
2 March: Pakistan, Senate
18 March: Germany, President
25 March: Hong Kong, Chief Executive
1 April: San Marino, Captains Regent
2 May: Hungary, President
30 May, 4, 8 and 11 June: Albania, President
30 June – 30 September: Belarus, Council of the Republic
19 July: 
India, President
Samoa, Head of the Government
20 July: Mauritius, President
18 September: Dominica, President
28 September: Morocco, House of Councillors
1 October: San Marino, Captains Regent
21–22 November: Slovenia, National Council
29 December: Algeria, Council of the Nation

See also
2012 in politics

References

National
National
Political timelines of the 2010s by year
National